María Cristina Iglesias is a Venezuelan politician and leader. She is the leader of the United Socialist Party of Venezuela. She is a two-time minister in the Government of Venezuela. She was first Minister for Labour and Social Security, she was subsequently appointed Minister of Commerce.

Early life and career 
On April 21, 2013, she was reaffirmed on the national network as Minister of Labour and Social Security for the government of Nicolás Maduro. In 2015 she was a candidate for circuit 3 of the Anzoátegui state for the 2015 parliamentary elections, where she lost to the candidates of the Democratic Unity Roundtable (MUD).

Controversies 
In August 2012, different print media published a photo of María Cristina Iglesias, where she is linked as a member of an opposition party Democratic Action to the ruling party of Venezuela (PSUV).

References 

Living people
Venezuelan politicians
United Socialist Party of Venezuela politicians
21st-century Venezuelan politicians
21st-century Venezuelan women politicians
Women government ministers of Venezuela
Year of birth missing (living people)
Trade ministers of Venezuela